Alive! In Osaka is a 2018 live video album from Japanese pop punk band Shonen Knife.

Reception
Writing for Spill Magazine, Aaaron Badgley rated this release a seven out of 10, noting that the video release shows that Shonen Knife is "incredibly fun to watch live and one sees how much they enjoy what they are doing", and calls this set they perform "excellent".

Track listing
All songs written by Naoko Yamano, except where noted
"Pop Tune" – 3:28
"Super Group" – 3:45
"Banana Chips" – 2:30
"Twist Barbie" – 2:18
"Bear Up Bison" – 2:21
"Bad Luck Song" – 4:12
"Green Tangerine" – 3:47
"Move On" – 4:23
"Jump into the New World" – 3:06
"Rock'n'roll T-shirt" – 4:21
"Cruel to Be Kind" (Ian Gomm and Nick Lowe) – 3:33
"All You Can Eat" – 3:38
"Sushi Bar Song" – 1:39
"Wasabi" – 2:36
"Ramen Rock" – 4:12
"Riding on the Rocket" – 3:34
"Buttercup (I'm a Super Girl)" – 2:40
"Pyramid Power" – 3:41
"Antonio Baka Guy" – 3:56
"It's a New Find" – 3:28
"BBQ Party" – 2:39

Personnel
Shonen Knife
Risa Kawano – drums
Atsuko Yamano – lead vocals, bass guitar, kazoo
Naoko Yamano – lead vocals, guitar

See also
List of 2018 albums

References

External links

Interview with Guitar Girl Mag

2018 live albums
2018 video albums
Good Charamel Records live albums
Good Charamel Records video albums
Live video albums
P-Vine Records live albums
P-Vine Records video albums
Shonen Knife live albums
Shonen Knife video albums